Kevin Lindsay (17 April 1924 – 26 April 1975) was an Australian actor, born in Bendigo, Victoria. He came to Britain in 1959 and is best known for his appearances in the Doctor Who series.

He appeared as Cho-Je in Planet of the Spiders, as well as playing Linx, the first Sontaran to be seen in the series, in The Time Warrior. Later, Lindsay played two more members of that species, in The Sontaran Experiment.

He died from a heart condition, nine days after his 51st birthday.

Filmography

References

External links
 

1924 births
1975 deaths
Australian male television actors
20th-century Australian male actors
Australian expatriates in the United Kingdom